was a town located in Mizuma District, Fukuoka Prefecture, Japan.

As of 2003, the town had an estimated population of 15,606 and a density of 969.32 persons per km2. The total area was 16.10 km2.

On February 5, 2005, Mizuma, along with the town of Kitano (from Mii District), the town of Jōjima (also from Mizuma District), and the town of Tanushimaru (from Ukiha District), was merged into the expanded city of Kurume and no longer exists as an independent municipality.

External links
Mizuma official website of Kurume in Japanese (some English)

Populated places disestablished in 2005
2005 disestablishments in Japan
Dissolved municipalities of Fukuoka Prefecture
Kurume